WHYC (88.5 FM) is a Public Radio East Classical radio station licensed to serve the community of Swan Quarter, North Carolina. The station is licensed to the Hyde County Board of Education with station programming originating from Public Radio East.

History

On February 7, 1980, the Hyde County Board of Education filed to build a radio station at the Mattamuskeet School in Swan Quarter. The station was approved by the Federal Communications Commission in October 1980 and licensed in 1981.

The FCC's records indicated that WHYC had been silent beginning on September 5, 2006, in large part because WHYC's operation impaired analog television reception, resulting in the FCC moving to cancel the license in 2010. The Hyde County school board countered, claiming that WHYC had never actually gone off the air; it resumed operating under special temporary authority in May 2010. In April 2016, the FCC ordered WHYC's license renewed for a short two-year term and found the Hyde County Board of Education liable for an $18,000 fine for a series of violations including failure to maintain its public inspection file or file biennial ownership reports, in addition to the lengthy silence. The school board and FCC reached a deal to reduce the fine to $2,250, contingent on the implementation of a compliance plan.

After the station was off the air for some time in early 2022, WHYC had resumed station operations with a Public Radio East Classical format, with legal identifications at the top of the hour stating WHYC 88.5 as one of its radio stations. It is unknown exactly when this change had taken place.

References

External links

HYC
High school radio stations in the United States